The Electoral Front United People (Portuguese: Frente Eleitoral Povo Unido or FEPU), was an electoral front of the Portuguese Communist Party, the Portuguese Democratic Movement/Electoral Democratic Commissions and the People's Socialist Front formed in order to participate in the Portuguese local election of 1976. The FEPU got 737,586 votes (17.7%).

Defunct left-wing political party alliances
Defunct political party alliances in Portugal
Portuguese Communist Party